The 2020 Internazionali di Tennis Città di Todi was a professional tennis tournament played on clay courts. It was the 14th edition of the tournament which was part of the 2020 ATP Challenger Tour. It took place in Todi, Italy between 17 and 23 August 2020.

Singles main-draw entrants

Seeds

 1 Rankings are as of 16 March 2020.

Other entrants
The following players received wildcards into the singles main draw:
  Francesco Forti
  Lorenzo Musetti
  Giulio Zeppieri

The following players received entry from the qualifying draw:
  Carlos Alcaraz
  Andrea Arnaboldi
  Viktor Galović
  Andrea Vavassori

Champions

Singles

 Yannick Hanfmann def.  Bernabé Zapata Miralles 6–3, 6–3.

Doubles

 Ariel Behar /  Andrey Golubev def.  Elliot Benchetrit /  Hugo Gaston 6–4, 6–2.

References

Internazionali di Tennis Città di Todi
2020
2020 in Italian tennis
August 2020 sports events in Italy